The Victoria Memorial is a large marble building on the Maidan in Central Kolkata, having its entrance on the Queen's Way. It was built between 1906 and 1921 by then British government. It is dedicated to the memory of Queen Victoria, Empress of India from 1876 to 1901.

The largest monument to a monarch anywhere in the world, it stands in 64 acres of gardens and is now a museum under the control of the Ministry of Culture. Possessing prominent features of british architecture of colonial era, it has evolved into one of the most popular places in the city.

History 

Following the death of Queen Victoria in January 1901, Lord Curzon, the Viceroy of India, suggested that a fitting memorial to the late Queen-Empress should be created in Calcutta, now called Kolkata, then the capital of British India. He proposed the construction of a grand building with a museum and gardens.
Curzon said,

The government officials, princes, politicians, and people of India responded generously to Lord Curzon's appeal for funds, and the total cost of construction of the monument, amounting to one crore, five lakhs of Rupees (₹), was entirely derived from their voluntary subscriptions.

The site chosen was near the present-day Raj Bhavan, known at the time as Government House. The construction of the Victoria Memorial was delayed by Curzon's departure from India in 1905, with a subsequent loss of local enthusiasm for the project. There was also some uncertainty about the strength of the foundations, and tests on them were carried out. On 4 January 1906, the new Prince of Wales laid the foundation stone.

The work of construction was entrusted to Messrs. Martin & Co. of Calcutta, and work on the superstructure began in 1910.

In 1912, before construction was finished, King George V announced the transfer of the capital of India from Calcutta to New Delhi. Thus, the Victoria Memorial came to stand in what would be a major provincial city, rather than a capital.

The Victoria Memorial was completed and formally opened to the public in 1921.

After 1947, some additions were made to the Memorial.

A smaller Victoria memorial was also constructed in the Hardoi District, which has since been converted into a city club for recreation. Mahatma Gandhi addressed meetings at Hardoi in the 1930s.

Design and architecture 

The architect of the Victoria Memorial was William Emerson (1843–1924). The design is in the Indo-Saracenic revivalist style which uses a mixture of British and Mughal elements with Venetian, Egyptian, Deccani architectural influences. It is constructed of white Makrana marble.
The gardens of the Victoria Memorial were designed by Lord Redesdale and David Prain. Emerson's assistant, Vincent Jerome Esch, designed the bridge of the north aspect and the garden gates. In 1902, Emerson engaged Esch to sketch his original design for the Victoria Memorial.

On top of the central dome of the Memorial is the  figure of the Angel of Victory. Surrounding the dome are allegorical sculptures including Art, Architecture, Justice, and Charity and above the North Porch are Motherhood, Prudence and Learning.

The Victoria Memorial is built of white Makrana marble. In design it echoes the Taj Mahal with its dome, four subsidiaries, octagonal-domed chattris, high portals, terrace, and domed corner towers.

Museum 
The Victoria Memorial has 25 galleries.

 These include the royal gallery, the national leader's gallery, the portrait gallery, central hall, the sculpture gallery, the arms and armory gallery, and the newer, Kolkata gallery. The Victoria Memorial has the largest single collection of the works of Thomas Daniell (1749–1840) and his nephew, William Daniell (1769–1837). It also has a collection of rare and antiquarian books such as the illustrated works of William Shakespeare, the Arabian Nights and the Rubaiyat by Omar Khayyam as well as books about kathak dance and thumri music by Nawab Wajid Ali Shah. However, the galleries and their exhibitions, the programmatic elements of the memorial do not compete with the purely architectural spaces or voids.

Victoria Gallery 
The Victoria Gallery displays several portraits of Queen Victoria and Prince Albert, and paintings illustrating their lives, by Winterhalter, Frank Salisbury, and W. P. Frith. These are copies of works of art in England. They include Victoria receiving the sacrament at her coronation in Westminster Abbey in June 1838; Victoria's wedding to Prince Albert in the Chapel Royal at St James's Palace in 1840; the christening of the Prince of Wales in St. George's Chapel, Windsor Castle, 1842; the wedding of the Prince of Wales to Alexandra of Denmark in 1863; and paintings of Victoria at the service for her Golden Jubilee at Westminster Abbey in 1887 and her Diamond Jubilee service at St Paul's Cathedral in June 1897.
Queen Victoria's childhood rosewood pianoforte and her correspondence desk from Windsor Castle stand in the center of the room, having been presented to the Victoria Memorial by her son Edward VII. On the south wall hangs the oil painting by  Vasily Vereshchagin of the state entry of the Prince of Wales into Jaipur in 1876.

Kolkata gallery 
In the mid-1970s, the matter of a new gallery devoted to the visual history of Kolkata was promoted by Saiyid Nurul Hasan, the minister for education. In 1986, Hasan became the governor of West Bengal and chairman of the Victoria Memorial board of trustees. In November 1988, Hasan hosted an international seminar on the Historical perspectives for the Kolkata tercentenary. The Kolkata gallery concept was agreed and a design was developed leading to the opening of the gallery in 1992. The Kolkata gallery houses a visual display of the history and development of Kolkata when the capital of India was transferred to New Delhi. The gallery also has a life-size   diorama of Chitpur road in the late 1800s.

Gardens 
The gardens at the Victoria memorial cover  and are maintained by a team of 21 gardeners. They were designed by Redesdale and David Prain. On Esch's bridge, between narrative panels by Goscombe John, there is a bronze statue of Victoria, by George Frampton. Empress Victoria is seated on her throne. In the paved quadrangles and elsewhere around the building, other statues commemorate Hastings, Charles Cornwallis, 1st Marquess Cornwallis, Robert Clive, Arthur Wellesley, and James Broun-Ramsay, 1st Marquess of Dalhousie. To the south of the Victoria, Memorial building is the Edward VII memorial arch. The arch has a bronze equestrian statue of Edward VII by Bertram Mackennal and a marble statue of Curzon by F. W. Pomeroy. The garden also contains statues of Lord William Bentinck, governor-general of India (1833–1835), George Robinson, 1st Marquess of Ripon, governor-general of India (1880–84), and Rajendra Nath Mookerjee, a pioneer industrialist of Bengal.
Following an order of the West Bengal High Court in 2004, an entry fee was imposed for the gardens, a decision welcomed by the general public except for few voices of dissent.

Gallery

References

External links 

"360 degree spherical panoramas of Victoria Memorial." India Tourism.

1921 establishments in India
Art museums and galleries in Kolkata
Buildings and structures completed in 1921
City museums
Gardens in India
20th century in Kolkata
Marble buildings
Monuments and memorials to Queen Victoria
Monuments and memorials in Kolkata
Museums established in 1921
Museums in Kolkata
Tourist attractions in Kolkata
Indo-Saracenic Revival architecture
National museums of India
20th-century architecture in India